"For An Angel" is a trance track by German DJ Paul van Dyk, which served as his debut track and would become his most famous work. The song was initially released in 1994 as a track on 45 RPM on the MFS record label, which was van Dyk's first studio album. It was later reworked and re-released in 1998 as "E-Werk Remix" on Deviant Records, a homage to the E-Werk nightclub where van Dyk used to be the resident DJ, the song held number one on the UK Dance Chart for several weeks. Since its release, the track has become one of the greatest and most influential trance tracks of all time. It was voted as the eighth greatest dance record of all time by Mixmag readers. The song was featured on the Gigi D'Agostino compilation album, Il programmino di Gigi D'agostino.

Music video
Three music videos exist for the track; one from 1994, filmed in the Riviera Maya in Mexico. In this video, Paul van Dyk, dressed in Malibu clothing, is seen sitting under a palm tree on the beach, in a river and other various locations, and later watching local children playing football on the beach. Also appearing are various short clips of the scenery surrounding him. This video is available on van Dyk's Global album. The next video, from 1998, featuring footage from the Love Parade in Berlin. The third, from 2009, was filmed at an exhibition in L.A. and Berlin.

Track listings
12" single (UK release)
"For An Angel" (PvD E-Werk Club Mix) – (7:43)
"For An Angel" (Way Out West Mix) – (5:48)
"For An Angel" (Terry Lee Brown Jnr Mix) – (6:28)

Charts

Weekly charts

Year-end charts

Certifications

Cover versions
The song was sampled in British singer Rachel McFarlane's 1998 song "Lover", which in turn has been mashed up with "For an Angel" by DJs in their club sets and bootleg releases.

The song was also sampled / covered in the 2022 song "In Your Arms (For An Angel)" by Topic, Robin Schulz, Nico Santos & Paul van Dyk where Paul van Dyk was included and credited.

References

1994 singles
1994 songs
Paul van Dyk songs
Songs written by Paul van Dyk